Wuqiang County is county in the southeast-central part of Hebei province, China. Both China National Highway 307 and G1811 Huanghua–Shijiazhuang Expressway pass through the county.

The famous luthier Song Chung has his workshop in Wuqiang.

Administrative divisions
The county administers 3 towns and 3 townships.

Towns:
Wuqiang, Jieguan, Zhouwo

Townships:
Doucun Township, Beidai Township, Sunzhuang Township

Climate

References

External links

County-level divisions of Hebei